Colegio Simón Bolívar may refer to:
Colegio Simón Bolívar (Acapulco)
Colegio Simón Bolívar de la Salle Pedregal
Colegio La Salle Simón Bolívar
Colegio Simón Bolívar (Chile)
Colegio Simón Bolívar (Col. Insurgentes, Mixcoac, Mexico City)
Colegio Simón Bolívar (Venezuela)